Abu'l-Abbas Ahmad ibn Ishaq (947/8 – 29 November 1031), better known by his regnal name al-Qadir, was the Abbasid caliph in Baghdad from 991 to 1031. He was the grandson of al-Muqtadir, and was chosen in place of the deposed caliph, at-Ta'i, his cousin.

Early life
Abu'l-Abbas Ahmad, the future al-Qadir, was born on 28 September 947 in Baghdad. His father Ishaq was a son of Caliph al-Muqtadir, and his mother Dimna was a slave concubine.

Shortly before his birth, in December 945, Baghdad and the rest of Iraq had been taken over by the Buyids. Although the Buyids were pro-Shi'a, they had retained the Abbasid caliphate for reasons of legitimacy. The Buyids ruled Iraq ostensibly as caliphal commander-in-chiefs, but in practice they had reduced the Abbasid caliphs to puppet rulers, confined to their palaces. 

As an Abbasid prince, Ahmad received a good education; he is recorded as having collected Shafi'i works on jurisprudence by Ahmad ibn Muhammad al-Harawi. When his father Ishaq died in March 988, Ahmad quarreled with his half-sister, Amina, over the inheritance. She reported him to their cousin, Caliph al-Ta'i, as seeking to replace him as caliph. To escape capture, Ahmad went into hiding for a while, before seeking refuge with the governor of the swamps of Bathihah near Basra, Muhadhdhib al-Dawla, for about three years. From there, Ahmad plotted against al-Ta'i, harping on his own loyalty to the Buyids, whereas al-Ta'i had been installed by a Turkic general, Sabuktakin.

Caliphate
In 991, the Buyid ruler Baha al-Dawla deposed al-Ta'i, because the latter had been showing signs of independence. In his stead, Baha al-Dawla appointed al-Qadir to the caliphate on 22 November 991 (12 Ramadan 381 AH). The deposed al-Ta'i was kept in captivity until his death twelve years later. Despite their previous differences, al-Qadir treated his predecessor well: al-Ta'i was not blinded, as had been the case for previous deposed caliphs, and he was accorded the treatment due to a reigning caliph.

Early years
At first, the new caliph seemed obedient, approving the nominations of officials and supporting his policies. New titles were conferred on Baha al-Dawla, and al-Qadir even agreed to marry the Buyid's daughter, although in the event she died just before the wedding was to take place. Seeing him as a Buyid puppet, the dynasts of the eastern Islamic world delayed recognition, and it was not until 1000 that the Samanids and Ghaznavids recognized al-Qadir's caliphate. The only independent actions taken during the first decade of his caliphate were the construction of a sixth Friday mosque in Baghdad, and the public proclamation of his just nine-year-old son Muhammad as heir apparent, with the title of al-Ghalib Bi'llah, in 1001.

Al-Qadir faced two usurpation attempts during this time. About 998, a certain Abdallah ibn Ja'far, a close relative of the deposed al-Ta'i, pretended to be the escaped caliph in Gilan and even gained the backing of the local ruler for a time, before he was discovered. At about the same time, in Transoxiana, another distant cousin, Abdallah ibn Uthman, a descendant of the 9th-century caliph al-Wathiq, pretended to be al-Qadir's designated heir and won the support of the local Karakhanid ruler. Al-Qadir's proclamation of his son as heir was a response to this pretender. The Karakhanids soon recognized the Abbasid caliph's suzerainty for the first time, and dropped their support of the pretender. The pretender then arrived in Baghdad, where he secretly gathered support, before moving again to the east via Basra, Kufa, and Kirman. He was finally arrested by the Ghaznavids on al-Qadir's orders, and died in captivity.

Championing of Sunnism

Nevertheless, when Baha al-Dawla moved his residence to Shiraz, effectively downgrading Baghdad and Iraq to a mere province, this left al-Qadir more room for independent activity, which he used to strengthen his authority.

With the Buyid ruler gone, the Caliph was able to establish his own chancery and nominate his own officials locally. While Baha al-Dawla had imposed his own candidates even as members of the caliphal court, al-Qadir was now able to re-hire the officials of al-Ta'i instead. Al-Qadir is also recorded as having a separate postal and information service, which he may have (re-)established. In this process he was aided by the broad popular support he could count on among the Sunni population of Baghdad, the decline of the Buyids' power, and the emergence of Mahmud of Ghazni in the east, who was not only a political opponent of the Buyids, but also a champion of Sunni orthodoxy. Mahmud's recognition of his suzerainty was a boost to al-Qadir, and the Ghaznavid ruler regularly kept the caliph informed of his campaigns, requesting caliphal confirmation for his rule over the countries he had conquered.

Although al-Qadir held no temporal political power, he nevertheless managed to exploit the opportunities he was presented with to greatly restore the moral and religious authority of the caliphate. The test came in 1003/4, when Baha al-Dawla tried to appoint a leading Alid, Abu Ahmad al-Musawi, as the chief  at Baghdad. Seeing in this an attempt to impose Twelver jurisprudence against Sunni practices, al-Qadir put himself at the head of a popular Sunni reaction, and successfully resisted the nomination. 

From this point on, the caliph placed himself at the forefront of a Sunni reaction against the Shi'a, both the Imami or Twelver variant, as well as the Isma'ili branch held by the rival Fatimid Caliphate. When a violent controversy broke out over the recension of the Quran by Ibn Mas'ud, which the Sunnis rejected but the Shi'a supported, al-Qadir summoned a commission of scholars that condemned the recension in April 1006, and ordered the execution of a Shi'a partisan who anathematized those who burned it. It was only the intervention of Baha al-Dawla that calmed matters and prevented the disorders from spreading.

Fatimid threat and the Baghdad Manifesto
The affair had also highlighted another threat, namely the inroads of Fatimid propaganda in Baghdad, where the name of the Fatimid caliph, al-Hakim bi-Amr Allah was hailed during the riots over Ibn Mas'ud's recension. 

This was a development that threatened the Sunni Abbasids and the Twelver Buyids alike, especially when Qirwash ibn al-Muqallad, the Uqaylid emir of Upper Mesopotamia, whose power stretched to the vicinity of Baghdad, recognized the suzerainty of the Fatimid caliph in August 1010. Al-Qadir responded by sending an embassy to Baha al-Dawla that succeeded in getting the Buyid ruler to apply pressure on the Uqaylid emir, who soon returned to Abbasid allegiance. 

The Emirs of Mecca also recognized Fatimid suzerainty, and for many years, Hajj pilgrims from Iraq were unable to visit the city as the security of their passage could not be guaranteed. Al-Qadir also tried to make the emir Abu'l-Futuh abandon the Fatimids and return to Abbasid allegiance, but without success.

As a further reaction, in November 1011 al-Qadir issued the Baghdad Manifesto, signed by both Sunni and Twelver scholars. The document not only condemned the Fatimid doctrine as false, but denounced their claims to descent from Ali as fraudulent, and their followers as enemies of Islam.

The 
Baha al-Dawla died in 1012, and was succeeded by his son, Sultan al-Dawla. The succession did nothing to halt the decline of the Buyid power in Iraq, or the mounting Sunni–Shi'a tension, but it did offer al-Qadir greater freedom of action. 

In 1017, he condemned Mu'tazilite and Shi'a doctrines, and ordered those jurists of the Hanafi school who had shown Mu'tazilite tendencies to do penance. The decree condemned Shi'a, Mu'tazilite, and even Ash'arite doctrines, and affirmed the veneration of the first four caliphs (the "Rashidun"), and of the Companions of Muhammad, as an obligation for all Muslims, against Shi'a beliefs that the first three caliphs had been illegitimate, as they had deprived Ali (the fourth caliph) of his rightful inheritance.

Relations with the Buyids
In 1021, Sultan al-Dawla ceded rule over Iraq to his younger brother, Musharrif al-Dawla. The latter came to Baghdad in March 1023, and ordered al-Qadir to come to him. Al-Qadir complied, but when Musharrif al-Dawla went on to renew the oath of allegiance of the Turkic military officers without asking for the Caliph's permission, al-Qadir protested, and in return secured a pledge of fidelity from Musharrif al-Dawla. 

Jalal al-Dawla entered Baghdad in 1026 and began curtailing the caliph's powers, but his rule was short-lived, as once again the troops turned against him. Al-Qadir sent a delegation to inform him that he must leave the capital, and prohibited him from returning for several years.

Final years
During his last years, al-Qadir reiterated and reinforced his theological doctrines. In 1029, three decrees once again denounced Mu'tazilism, condemned the doctrine of Quranic createdness, and reaffirmed the special status of the Rashidun caliphs and the need of "enjoining good and forbidding wrong". This coincided with the campaigns of Mahmud of Ghazni against the Shi'a, the Buyids (Ray was captured in 1029 and Kirman attacked two years later), and the Ghaznavid expansion into India.

In 1030, al-Qadir named his son Abu Ja'far, the future al-Qa'im, as his heir, a decision taken completely independently of the Buyid rulers. He died after an illness on 29 November 1031. Initially he was buried in the caliphal palace, but in the next year he was ceremonially moved to al-Rusafa.

Legacy
Historians generally give a favourable view of al-Qadir as a mild-mannered and gentle person. He went out in disguise among the people, gave alms to the poor, and regularly attended public sessions where the commoners could voice their complaints.

Al-Qadir's reign was an important turning point in the history of the Abbasid caliphate and Sunni Islam. Previous Abbasid caliphs had sympathized with rationalist schools like the Mu'tazilites, and been opposed by the conservative traditionalist Sunni scholars. One of the most notable Sunni scholars, Ahmad ibn Hanbal, founder of the Hanbali school, had been persecuted by the Inquisition-like , founded by Caliph al-Ma'mun. Al-Qadir on the other hand succeeded in repositioning the caliphate as the champion of conservative Sunnism, specifically of the Hanbali branch. Apart from the decrees issued in his own name, he commissioned works by theologians and jurists. Al-Mawardi's al-Iqna or even his famous al-Ahkam al-Sultaniyya, the Mukhtasars of al-Quduri and Abd al-Wahhab al-Maliki, as well as a refutation of  doctrines by Ali ibn Sa'id al-Istakhri, are said to have been composed on his request. According to the 12th/13th-century historian Ibn al-Athir, under al-Qadir, "the caliphate recovered its prestige".

Until then, the Sunnis had defined themselves mostly in opposition to the Shi'a, but "now there was a body of positive belief which had to be accepted by anyone claiming to be a Sunni". At the same time, the condemnation of Shi'a practices created a sharp distinction between the two groups, that had not hitherto been the case. As Hugh Kennedy put it, "it was no longer possible to be simply a Muslim, one was either a Sunni or a Shi'a". Al-Qadir thus laid the ideological foundations for what has been termed the "Sunni Revival" of the 11th century, which culminated with the destruction of the Buyids by the Seljuk Turks, a new steppe power who saw themselves as champions of Sunnism and of the Abbasid caliph.

References

Sources
 
 
 
 
 
 
  
 

947 births
1031 deaths
10th-century Arabs
10th-century Abbasid caliphs
11th-century Arabs
11th-century Abbasid caliphs
10th century in Iraq
11th century in Iraq
Anti-Shi'ism
People under the Buyid dynasty
Sunni Islam